(السجدة), is the 32nd chapter (sūrah) of the Quran with 30 verses (āyāt). The name of the chapter has been translated as ۩ "Prostration"  or "Adoration". and is taken from the fifteenth verse, which mentions those who "... fall prostrate and hymn the praise of their Lord".

Regarding the timing and contextual background of the  believed revelation, it is an earlier "Meccan surah", which means it is believed revealed in Mecca, instead of later in Medina. Theodor Nöldeke (d.1930), translator of Tabari (Arabic – German), estimated it as the 70th (Nöldeke chronology).  The traditional Egyptian chronology puts the chapter as the 75th chapter by the order of revelation (after Quran 23).

Summary
The first half of the chapter covers some of Islam's theological concepts, including revelation, God, creation of human beings, resurrection and the judgment day. The second half discusses the contrast between those who "fall prostrate" before God and those who "turn away" from God's sign. The chapter then mentions the Children of Israel as an example of people who follow God's guidance through Moses.

Ayat (verses)
 1  A. L. M. The "mysterious letters" alif, lām, and mīm  
 2  The Quran is without doubt inspired revelation
 3  Muhammad did not forge the Quran
 4  The heavens and earth created in six days
 5  God will judge all men after the resurrection
5-8 The Omniscient God the Creator of mankind
 9  Yet man, the creature, denies the resurrection
 10  Unbelievers shall be brought before God
 11  They shall repent too late to avail for pardon
 12-14  Hell must be filled with genii and men
۩  15-19  The reward of true believers
 20-21  The punishment of unbelievers here and hereafter
 22  To reject God's signs a great sin
 23  The Pentateuch given to Moses
 24  Teachers chosen from among the Israelites to direct them in the way of God
 25  God will settle their disputes in the Judgment-day
 26  The people of Makkah warned by the fate of their predecessors
 27  The resurrection typified in nature, but infidels do not understand
 28-30  The infidels urge Muhammad to hasten the judgment-day

Quranic commentary

A hadith, narrated in the Tafsir of ibn Kathir (d.1373), said that Muhammad often recited As-Sajda together with Al-Insan (Quran 76) for the early morning prayer (fajr) every Friday. al-Alusi (d.1854), amongst others confirmed another report stating that Muhammad often recited the chapter before going to sleep.

Al-Suyuti (d.1505) named the chapter  “Sūrah of the Beds,” (sūrat al-maḍājiʿ) after a mention of those who "shun [their] beds" in order to worship God at night (tahajjud). Other names of the chapter include the choice of Al-Qurtubi (d.1274): Alif Lam Mim Tanzil ("Alif, Lam, Mim, The Revelation") after the first words from verses 1 and 2.

According to the Islamic tradition, the chapter was revealed during the Meccan phase of Muhammad's prophethood. Some scholars argue, based on attaching occasions of revelations (asbāb al-nuzūl), that several verses (some say verses 16–20, some say only 18–20, some say only 16) are from Medinan phase, but the arguments are not widely accepted. For example, Mahmud al-Alusi opines that the close connection between these verses and the preceding ones means that they are likely from the same period.

References

Citations 
.

References

External links 
Quran 32 Clear Quran translation
Q32:2, 50+ translations, islamawakened.com

Sajda